Lawrence James Flaherty (July 4, 1878 – June 13, 1926) was an American politician who served part of one term as a U.S. Representative from California from 1925 until his death in 1926.

Biography 
Born in San Mateo, California, Flaherty moved with his parents to San Francisco in 1888. He attended public school and learned the trade of a cement mason. He served as member of the board of police commissioners of San Francisco 1911–1915.
He served in the California State Senate from 1915 to 1923.
He served as president of the San Francisco Building Trades from 1921 to 1926.
He was appointed United States surveyor of customs for the port of San Francisco on November 1, 1921, and served until March 3, 1925, when he resigned, having been elected to Congress.

Congress 
Flaherty was elected as a Republican to the Sixty-ninth Congress and served from March 4, 1925, until his death in New York City on June 13, 1926, aged 47.

He was interred in Holy Cross Cemetery, near San Mateo, California.

See also
List of United States Congress members who died in office (1900–49)

References

External links

Join California Lawrence J. Flaherty

1878 births
1926 deaths
Republican Party California state senators
Republican Party members of the United States House of Representatives from California
20th-century American politicians